Graviola Ewing (6 September 1930 – 27 March 2020) was a Guatemalan sprinter. She competed in the women's 100 metres at the 1952 Summer Olympics. She was the first woman to represent Guatemala at the Olympics.

References

External links
 

1930 births
2020 deaths
Athletes (track and field) at the 1951 Pan American Games
Athletes (track and field) at the 1952 Summer Olympics
Guatemalan female sprinters
Olympic athletes of Guatemala
Competitors at the 1950 Central American and Caribbean Games
Central American and Caribbean Games silver medalists for Guatemala
Central American and Caribbean Games bronze medalists for Guatemala
Place of birth missing
Central American and Caribbean Games medalists in athletics
Pan American Games competitors for Guatemala
Olympic female sprinters